Darling Harbour was an electoral district of the Legislative Assembly in the Australian state of New South Wales, in the vicinity of Darling Harbour. It was created in the 1904 re-distribution of electorates following the 1903 New South Wales referendum, which required the number of members of the Legislative Assembly to be reduced from 125 to 90. It consisted of the abolished seats of Sydney-Gipps and Sydney-Lang and parts of the abolished seats of Sydney-King and Sydney-Denison. In 1920, with the introduction of proportional representation, it was absorbed into Balmain.

Members for Darling Harbour

Election results

References

Former electoral districts of New South Wales
Darling Harbour
1904 establishments in Australia
1920 disestablishments in Australia
Constituencies established in 1904
Constituencies disestablished in 1920